KLIU may refer to:

 KLIU-LP, a low-power radio station (95.9 FM) licensed to serve Unalakleet, Alaska, United States
 Littlefield Municipal Airport (ICAO code KLIU)